Acrossocheilus is a genus of ray-finned fishes in the family Cyprinidae, native to freshwater in China, Taiwan, Laos, and Vietnam.

Species
There are currently 26 recognized species of this genus. Four species have sometimes been moved to Masticbarbus, but it has yet to be widely accepted. Some species from Southeast Asia have been moved to Neolissochilus.

 Acrossocheilus aluoiensis (H. D. Nguyễn, 1997)
 Acrossocheilus baolacensis V. H. Nguyễn, 2001
 Acrossocheilus beijiangensis H. W. Wu & R. D. Lin, 1977
 Acrossocheilus clivosius (S. Y. Lin, 1935)
 Acrossocheilus fasciatus (Steindachner, 1892)
 Acrossocheilus hemispinus (Nichols, 1925)
 Acrossocheilus ikedai (Harada, 1943) 
 Acrossocheilus iridescens (Nichols & C. H. Pope, 1927)
 Acrossocheilus jishouensis J. Zhao, X. L. Chen & W. W. Li, 1997
 Acrossocheilus kreyenbergii (Regan, 1908)
 Acrossocheilus lamus (Đ. Y. Mai, 1978)
 Acrossocheilus longipinnis (H. W. Wu, 1939)
 Acrossocheilus macrophthalmus V. H. Nguyễn, 2001
 Acrossocheilus malacopterus E. Zhang, 2005
 Acrossocheilus microstoma Pellegrin & Chevey, 1936
 Acrossocheilus monticola (Günther, 1888)
 Acrossocheilus multistriatus Z. J. Lan, B. P. Chan & J. Zhao, 2014
 Acrossocheilus paradoxus (Günther, 1868)
 Acrossocheilus parallens (Nichols, 1931)
 Acrossocheilus rendahli (S. Y. Lin, 1931)
 Acrossocheilus spinifer L. Y. Yuan, Z. Q. Wu & E. Zhang, 2006
 Acrossocheilus wenchowensis K. F. Wang, 1935
 Acrossocheilus wuyiensis S. H. Wu & H. X. Chen, 1981
 Acrossocheilus xamensis Kottelat, 2000
 Acrossocheilus yalyensis V. H. Nguyễn, 2001
 Acrossocheilus yunnanensis (Regan, 1904)

References

 
Cyprinidae genera
Freshwater fish of Asia